The Sickness is the 29th book in the Animorphs series, authored by K. A. Applegate. It is known to have been ghostwritten by Melinda Metz. It is narrated by a character named Cassie.

Plot summary

Cassie and Jake are dragged along by Rachel and the others to the school dance. They have a few good laughs when Ax's unfamiliarity with human culture scares away some of the crowd. The laughter stops, however, when he demorphs involuntarily. It soon becomes apparent that Ax is suffering from an inflamed Tria gland (as well as a fever)—much like the lymphatic tonsils in the human mouth. Unlike humans, though, this gland is located at the back of Ax's brain. If it bursts, it will cause irreversible and fatal damage to the brain. Cassie hides the sick alien in her barn, and Erek the Chee erects a hologram around them both.

At the same time, Mr. Tidwell, one of Cassie's teachers, informs her that Aftran, a Yeerk who Cassie met and convinced to free her host, has been captured by Visser Three. She will be tortured, and will thus be forced to divulge all of her secrets, including that of Cassie and the Animorphs. Cassie endures her friends' thinly veiled blame, but they decide to act. They form a plan to enter the Yeerk pool via the facility's extensive piping system. Tobias brings them eels to morph. The children morph and enter the pipes, but Jake falls ill from Ax's virus (although it is established that this virus will just make humans sick rather than having the fatal effects that the Andalite version has on Ax). The plan fails, and they return to the surface—through a fire hose and into a burning building.

That night, Cassie has a bad dream. In the morning, she discovers that Rachel is ill. Mr. Tidwell reveals he shares control of his body with Illim, a Yeerk, and that he is a member of the Yeerk Peace Movement. He tells her the time and location of Aftran's interrogation. Marco is the next to fall ill. Then, while Cassie is with him, Tobias, too, falls ill to it, flying into one of the barn rafters. To keep Tobias safe, she locks him up next to a golden eagle, much to his dismay.

Cassie is all alone, and she needs to infiltrate the Yeerk pool, so Illim allows her to acquire his Yeerk DNA and take control of Mr. Tidwell. Cassie and Mr. Tidwell enter the enemy stronghold, and she is disgorged into the Yeerk pool. She finds Aftran's cage, and manages to take control of a voluntary host. She rams the Visser, who drops Aftran. Cassie leaves the girl, dives back into the pool, morphs her osprey, and carries Aftran away, pursued by Visser Three, who has morphed a creature resembling an eyeball with tentacles.

Back at the barn, Cassie learns that Ax is in crisis. She allows Aftran to enter Ax's head and tell her the location of the Tria gland. Cassie makes her incision, and pulls the gland out, saving Ax's life.

A few days later, the other Animorphs have recovered from the illness. Aftran is safe, but in order to keep her alive without access to the Kandrona, the Animorphs allow her to morph a humpback whale—on the condition that she stays in that form as a nothlit.

Morphs

TV series
An episode was based on the part when Cassie morphs into a Yeerk. Although in the TV series, it is actually Rachel who becomes a Yeerk.

References 

Animorphs books
1999 science fiction novels
1999 American novels
Novels about diseases and disorders